Konar Siah (also Romanized as Konār Sīāh, Konār-e Sīāh, Konār Seyāh; also known as Kūnār-e Sīāh, Kūnār Seyāh, and Kūnār Sīāh) is a village in Dulab Rural District, Shahab District, Qeshm County, Hormozgan Province, Iran. At the 2006 census, its population was 324, in 84 families.

References 

Populated places in Qeshm County